The Lancashire Spinners are an English  basketball club from Whitefield, Greater Manchester.

The Spinners currently operates a Men's senior team in the National Basketball League, competing in Division 3 North, and a Women's senior team in the Women's National Basketball League.  The club have held England Basketball Clubmark accreditation since 2011, and also enter Women's and Junior teams in local competition.

Club history

Originally formed as an amateur outfit, the club started life as the Old Rossendalians, competing in local competition for several years before being invited to join the Manchester & District League in 1968.  Despite the step up to regional competition, the club remained a small, locally focused organisation for many years, until a drive to attract players from outside the valley saw the club re-branded as the Rossendale Basketball Club in 1989.  The award of a Lottery grant in 2001 paved the way for the club to expand their offering by developing a junior program, leading to a merger with the local Rossendale Aliens junior team.

The growth of the club re-energised the organisation, which led to greater investment from sponsors and in turn saw the club renamed as the Rossendale Raptors in 2010, followed swiftly by successfully applying for Basketball England Clubmark accreditation at the start of 2011 and making their debut in the national Division Four (North) league for the 2011/2012 season.  The newly named club's inaugural season at national level saw the Raptors claim the Division Four (North) title with a 20-2 record, setting up a run through to the final of the end-of-season playoffs where they defeated the Worcester Wolves' second team 91-87.

Stepping up to Division Three for the following year, the Raptors took sixth place in their first season and followed that up in their second by winning 17 of their 20 games on the way to the Division Three (North) title.  While the Hackney White Heat prevented them from repeating the playoff victory, a second promotion in three years was achieved regardless.  With the goal of establishing themselves at national level complete, the club relocated to the Castle Leisure Centre in Bury and rebranded themselves as the Lancashire Spinners in 2014 to attract a wider audience and to prepare for a future push towards the professional leagues.

The following year saw the club battling at the top of the Division Two table against London Lituanica in an incredibly close campaign between two strong teams in the midst of a rapid rise through the league structure.  While the Spinners narrowly finished as runners-up to their new rivals in a close league campaign and playoff final, the club did not end the 2014/2015 season empty-handed, claiming the Patrons Cup with a 118-86 win in the final against Lituanica.  A post-season merger with the local Bury Blue Devils team also added a Women's team to the Spinners organisation, while massively strengthening the junior ranks to give local talent more opportunities to develop on their way to the senior teams.

Club Honours

NBL Division 3 North Champions
 2020 
Patrons Cup Winners
 2015
EBL Division 3 League Champions
 2014
EBL Division 4 League Champions
 2012
EBL Division 4 Playoff Champions
 2012

Season-by-season records

References

External links
Official Lancashire Spinners Facebook Page
Official Lancashire Spinners Twitter
Official Lancashire Spinners YouTube Channel

Basketball teams in England
Basketball teams established in 1962